Dr. Xargle  is a series of children's picture books written by Jeanne Willis and illustrated by Tony Ross; the original six books were published by Andersen Press from 1988 to 1993. It features an alien perspective on human civilization, especially the life of British children and their families. Alternatively, Dr. Xargle is the main character, an alien who studies Earth and teaches schoolchildren about it. Sometimes he takes them on field trips to Earth in human disguises. Finally, Dr. Xargle is a 1997 British television series based on the original books. 

For the third book in the series, Dr. Xargle's Book of Earth Tiggers (1990), Ross was highly commended runner up for the annual Kate Greenaway Medal from the Library Association, recognising the year's best children's book illustration by a British subject.

Books 

All seven books were published in hardcover editions by Andersen Press. The original series was published in British paperback editions by Red Fox (Random House) within a few years. In the United States, the books have titles such as Earthlets, as explained by Professor Xargle—the first book, published by E. P. Dutton in 1989.

 Dr. Xargle's Book of Earthlets (1988)
 Dr. Xargle's Book of Earth Hounds (1989)
 Dr. Xargle's Book of Earth Tiggers (1990), A.K.A Earth Tigerlets
 Dr. Xargle's Book of Earth Mobiles (1991)
 Dr. Xargle's Book of Earth Weather (1992)
 Dr. Xargle's Book of Earth Relations (1993)
 Dr. Xargle Stories (1999), an Audiobook collection of all the books except Sleepovers
 Dr. Xargle's Book of Earthlet Sleepovers (2004), a limited edition picture book written to provide support for children who wet the bed

Television series 

A 13-episode television series was produced by CINAR and King Rollo Films, and broadcast in 1997: Dr. Xargle and his students are animatronic puppets, while the students' lessons about Earth are animated.

Unnamed in the books, the planet was identified as Planet Queeg, and the children were called Queegles. It is unclear whether their species is named Queegle, or this is the name for their infants (the adults being called Queegs).

Characters 

Dr. Xargle: Voiced by Willie Rushton, who died shortly after his lines were recorded.
Xamster
Matron
Monitor
Cute
Rebel
Tardy Queegle
Famished Queegle
Nigel Spume, a human reporter trying to prove the aliens' existence.

Episodes 

Each of the 13 episodes had a duration of approximately 30 minutes.
Several episode broadcast dates, as well as the episode order, are currently unknown.
There was also a break in broadcasting that has not yet been accounted for.

Notes

References

External links 

  —US editions of the first book; immediately, first US edition
More about Dr Xargle's Book of Earthlet Sleepovers
TV Show Information
TV Show episode synopses and opening titles

British picture books
Series of children's books
British children's animated science fiction television series
British television shows featuring puppetry
1990s British children's television series
Television series by Cookie Jar Entertainment
Television series by DHX Media
Television series by ITV Studios
1997 British television series debuts
1998 British television series endings
English-language television shows